The Adolf-Wuerth-Center for the History of Psychology is a scientific institution of the Julius-Maximilians-University of Würzburg.

History 
The collection of the history of psychology was founded by Werner Traxel in 1981 as part of the Institute for History of Modern Psychology at University of Passau. In 2006, the target agreements of the Free State of Bavaria - as a result of the Mittelstraß commission - aimed to relocate the collection to the university city of Würzburg. The aim was to bundle strengths of different universities.

References 

History of psychology
University of Würzburg
Research institutes in Germany
Educational institutions established in 1981
1981 establishments in Germany